The following are or were trademarks of the Sony Group Corporation or its subsidiaries:

0–9
 3 MAX+
 700 Series

A
  A Vision For Business
  a2DVD
 ACAMS
  Access Center
  AccuPower
 Accurate Image Restoration
 Active Prism
 Advanced HAD
 Advanced Intelligent Tape (word & logo)
 Advanced Storage by Sony
 AIBO
 Sony α (Alpha DSLR)
  AIR
 Air-Egg
 AirTrac
 America's Digital Yearbook
 APOS
  ASC
 ATRAC
 ATRAC3
 Audio Very Important Professional Club
 Audio VIP Club
 Auto Access
 Auto Clock Reveal
 Auto Dialer
 Auto ImageSet
 Auto Shutter
 AutoAlert
 AutoCenter and Size
 Automatic Music Sensor
 AV Laser

B
 BabyCall
 Backglow
 Because There’s So Much More to Hear
 Beta Hi-Fi
 Beta/Plex
 Betacam
 Betacam SP
 Betacam SX
 Betacart
 Betamax
 Betamovie
 BetaScan
 BetaScanII
 BetaSkipScan
 Bicro-Beam
 Bidirex
 BiERA
 Bitcorder
 Bloggie (camcorder)
 Blue ICS
 Blu-ray Disc
 BoxEdit
 BRAVIA
 Brilliant Color and Sound

C
 Cable Mouse
 Cappra
 Carbonmirror
 Carrier Gate
 Cassette-corder
 CCD Iris
 CCD Protection Plan
 CD Complete
 CD Complete Pro
 CD Ease
 CD Extreme
 CD-Text
 CD-IT
 CD-IT Pro
 CD-ROM (key-shaped logo)
 CD-ROM Discman
 Cdit
 CDit Pro
 Cell
 Century Media
 Cerasin Chassis
 Change the Way You Hear the World
 Change The Way You Remember The World
 Change the Way You See the World
 Channel Magic
 Childloc
 Choose Your Definition
 CineAlta
 Cinema 8
 CineMotion
 Cinenet
 Cineza
 Clear Scan
 Clear Scan 25
 Clear Voice
 ClearScan
 ClearScan 25
 Click to DVD
 CLIÉ
 Clip Motion
 ClipEdit
 Cliplink
 ClipMaster
 ClipServer
 Color Pure Filter
 Commercial Pass
 Compact Series
 Completing the Picture
 Conductor
 Confer-Corder
 Connect & Create
 Converting The Industry Bit By Bit
 Corporate Audio
 CRVdisc
 Custom File
 Custom Index
 Cyber-shot
 Cyber-shot Pro
 Cyberframe

D
 D-WAVE
 D-WAVE Cosm
 D-WAVE Zuma
 Dash (personal internet viewer)
 D8
 D8 (logo)
 DASH (logo)
 Data Discman
 Data Media (logo)
 Datstation
 DD230
 DDE
 DDL
 DDS/Digital Data Storage (logo)
 DDS2/Digital Data Storage (logo)
 DDS3/Digital Data Storage (logo)
 DDS4/Digital Data Storage (logo)
 Defining the Digital Future
 Desktop Library
 DG5CL
 Digital Betacam (logo)
 Digital Cinema Sound
 Digital Dream
 Digital Dream Kids
 Digital Dynamic Convergence
 Digital FlexRes
 Digital Gate
 Digital Link
 Digital Message Shuttle
 Digital Monitor Series
 Digital Network Recorder
 Digital PCLink (logo)
 Digital Reality Creation
 Digital Relay
 Digital Signal Transfer
 Digital Sketch
 Digital Sparkle
 Digital Sync
 Digital With Soul
 Digital. Powerful. Transportable.
 Digital8
 Direct access
 Direct Digital Link
 Direct Digital Stream
 Direct Stream Digital
 Direct Tuning
 Disc Explorer
 Disc Memo
 Disc2Phone
 Discam
 DiscJockey
 Discman
 Disk B-Roll
 Display Mouse
 Displays by Sony
 Disturb the Peace
 DJ Bank
 DME Link
 DNAS
 Donpisha
 DRC
 Dream Machine (a line of clock radios, also the development codename for the PlayStation)
 DreamLink
 Drive My Imagination
 DSD
 DSP Axis
 DST
 DT
 DTF
 DTF (logo)
 dtv-Ready
 dtv-Ready (logo)
 Dual Adjust Head
 Dual Axis
 Dual Discrete
 Dual Room Link Control
 DualShock (series of PlayStation controllers)
 DVCam
 DVD Dream
 DVD Navigator
 DVD Style
 DVgate
 DynaFit
 Dynalatitude
 Dynamic Color
 Dynamic Focus
 Dynamic Picture
 Dynamic Receiver
 Dynamic Tracking
 Dynamicron

E
 e-conference (logo)
 E-FILE
 Easy Activation
 EasySearch
 Eco Info (logo)
 ED Beta
 Edit Monitor
 Edit Search
 EditStation
 Elliptical Correction System
 eMarker
 Enhanced Elliptical Correction System
 Ergo-Angle
 ESP
 ESP MAX
 Evaticle
 eVilla
 Exmor
 Express Commander
 Express Navigator
 Express Support
 Express Tuning
 Extralloy
 Extreme Editing
 Exwave HAD
 EZ AUDIO
 EZ Editor
 EZ Flip Commander
 EZ Memories
 EZ-Flip
 Ezfit
EAT SLEEP PLAY

F
FastPort
 FD Trinitron/WEGA (logo)
 Flash Recording System
 Flat Out Better
 Flexicart
 Flexsys
 Flexys
 Flying Erase
 Fontopia
 Forget to Set
 Forget-to-Set
 Fulfil
 Full Color Sound
 Fun & Games
 FunMail
 Fyla

G
 G Chassis
 G-Chassis
 G-Sense
 G-Protection
 G-Station
 Game Sync
 Game Xpand
 GeoLock Plus
 Get It Backwards
 Giga Pocket
 GIGAMO
 Glasstron
 Gold Plug
 GoldPlus
 Grand Wega
 Graphic Picture Enhancement
 Great Products Great People
 GVIF

H
 H.EAR
 Handshake design
 Handycam
 Handycam Pro
 Handycam Vision
 HDCAM
 HDTV (logo)
 HDNA
 HDVS
 HDVS (logo)
 HF High Fidelity
 Hi Band
 Hi-Band
 Hi-eye Q
 Hi-Packing
 Hi-Scan
 Hi-Scan 1080I
 Hi8
 Hi8 Editor
 HiDensity
 High Density Linear
 High Density Linear Converter
 HMZ-T1
 Home Entertainment Universe
 Home-Jet
 Hyper HAD
 Hyper Metal
 HZDM

I
 I-Link
 i.LINK
 ID Telephone
 IE / Ion Energy (logo)
 ImageStation
 Indextron
 InfoLithium
 Infostick
 Innovation At Work
 Integrated System Commander
 Intelligent Dialer
 Intellilight
 Intellitape
 Inzone
 Isara
 It's A Sony "S"
 It's As Easy As A Floppy
 Izziton

J
 Jfutura
 JJTRON
 Jog dial
 JumboTron
 JumboWall

L
 LanBacker
 LANC (logo)
 LaserLink
 Lasermax
 Leading The Way
 Learn From the Leaders
 Legato Linear
 Life Just Got Better
 Light Sensor
 Lightsensor
 Lissa
 Liv
 Live in Your World, Play In Ours
 LocationFree
 Lumisponder

M
 Macro Storage Through Patented Micro Technology
 MacView
 Magic Link
 MagicGate
 Make the Internet Yours
 Making Business Pleasure
 Marine Pack
 Matrix Sound
 Matrix Surround
 Mavica
 Mavicap
 Mavicard
 Mavigraph
 Mavipak
 Max-8
 Maxxum
 Maximum Television
 Maximum TV
 MD Link (logo)
 MD Link Plus
 MD View
 MD Walkman
 MD Walkman (logo)
 MDLP
 MDP Muli Disc Player
 Media Bar
 Media Communicator
 Media Forum
 Media Mover
 Media Park
 Media Window
 Mega Bass
 Mega Bass Port
 Mega Storage
 Mega Watchman
 MegaStorage
 Memory Match Ringing
 Memory Stick
 Memory Stick Micro M2
 Memory Stick Pro Duo
 Memory Stick Duo
 Memory Stick Pro-HG
 Menu Disc
 MenuNav
 Messenger Card
 Metal Select
 Metreon
 MG/MemoryStick (logo)
 Micro Beam
 Micro Vault
 Microblack
 Microfocus
 MICROMV
 MID
 MiniDisc (logo)
 Mirrorblack
 Missioncontrol
 MobilePort
 Motion Eye
 MovieShaker
 MPEG IMX
 Multi Channel Access
 Multi Disc Player
 Multi-Channel Access
 Multiscan
 Music Clip
 Music Pops
 Musiclub
 Musicruise
 My Entertainment, My Place, My Time
 My First Sony
 My Life Online
 Mylo

N
 NanoOs
 Nasne
 nav-u
 Net MD
 Network SmartCapture
 Network Walkman
 Newsbase
 NewsCache
 NightShot and NightShot 0 Lux
 No One Can Duplicate Us
 No Sweat Internet
 Nothing Escapes Us

O
 OctaStation 2.4
 Ohm Page
 On Time Support
 One Box, One System, One Simple Set-Up, One Unbelievable Experience
 OpenMG
 OPENR
 Orchestra Seat
 Our Media Is Your Memory

P
 PacITman
 Pan Focus
 PanFocus
 PC by Sony
 PC Cam
 PCBacker
 Pen Tablet (logo)
 Personal Technology Experience
 Personal-Jet
 PetaApp
 PetaBack
 PetaServe
 PetaSite
 PhatFree
 PhatMan
 PhatPig
 Photoegg
 Pico Player
 Picture Paradise
 PictureBook
 Pictured!
 PictureGear
 PicturePark
 PictureToy
 Pit Signal Processing (logo)
 PJ CALC!
 PJ Projects!
 Plasmatron
 Platinum Plus
 PlatinumPlus
 Playlist Builder
 PlayNow
 PlayStation
 PlayStation (console)
 PlayStation 2
 PlayStation BB
 PlayStation 3
 PlayStation Home
 PlayStation Network
 PlayStation 4
 PlayStation 5
 PlayStation Portable
 PlayStation Vita
 Plug and Present
 PocketStation
 Polygoneater
 Portable Music (logo)
 Portable Music icon
 Portable Music With Style
 Power Burn
 Power Cinema
 Power HAD
 Power HAD WS
 Power Play
 Powerful for Work, Portable for Play
 Precision Drive
 Pressman
 PRO 8
 Pro Dat Plus
 Pro-Optic
 Profeel
 Program Palette
 Projector Station
 ProMavica
 ProSound
 PSone
 PSX
 PSYC (not to be confused with PSYC, which is prior art)

Q
 Qbric
 QIC (logo)
 Qic (logo)
 Qic-ER
 QRIO
 QS 2.4 (logo)
 QSDI
 Quadrastation 2.4
 Quick Start
 Quickset
 QuickShare

R
 R2 Reality Regenerator (logo)
 Rapid Access
 Ready-Focus
 ReadyCharge
 Real-Time Storage Workhorse
 Reality Regenerator
 RealView
 Remote Commander
 Repeat Learning System
 Rewarding Recording
 RITE
 Rotary Commander
 Ruvi

S
 S-Cache Accelerated (logo)
 S-Link
 S-Master
 S-TACT
 S2
 S2 SPORTS (logo)
 SA-CD
 Scene Shuffle
 Scoopman
 ScreenBlast
 SD (logo)
 Search Media
 SecondOpinion
 Seeing is Believing
 Select
 Selfset
 Series 7
 Servo Stabilizer
 Setup Log
 Setup Navi
 Shigei
 Shoot! Store! Show!
 Shot Box
 Side Shot
 Signal Seeker
 SignalSeeker
 SiteLink
 SIXAXIS
 SlimDock
 Smart Control
 SmartDome
 SmartFile
 SmartProjector
 Smooth Scan
 SmoothScan
 Snap Shot
 SnapJack
 SnapShot
 Snoozinator
 SOBAX (Calculator Line; "Solid State Abacus")
 So-net
 So The Beat Goes On
 SoftwarePlus
 Solar Window
 Soloist
 SonicFlow
 SonicStage
 SonicStage Mastering Studio
 Sony
 Sony Pictures
 Sony Card
 Sony Interactive Entertainment 
 Sony Data Storage. When the Data Really Matters.
 Sony Dynamic Digital Sound
 Sony Ericsson
 Sony Express
 Sony Graphics (logo)
 Sony Innovators
 Sony Mobile (logo)
 Sony Music
 Sony Module Express
 Sony Online Entertainment
 Sony Plaza
 Sony Security Systems (logo)
 Sony Signatures
 Sony Style
 Sony Style Connect
 Sony Tablet
 Sony VAIO Direct (word & logo)
 Sony Vision-S
 Sony Wonder
 Sony-matic
 Sound Is Meant To Be Heard, Not Seen
 Sound-Sensor
 Spec Pro
 Special Cleaning Mechanism
 Special Cleaning Mechanism (logo)
 SPECL
 SpectaPix
 SpectaProof
 Speed Surf
 Speedman (logo)
 Sport MDR
 SportsBand
 Sportsfinder
 Sportspack
 Spressa
 SSD (logo)
 Station Memo
 Steady Sound
 SteadyShot
 SteadySound
 Storage by Sony
 Storage in a Small Format
 Storage Rewards
 Storage Solutions for Every Business Landscape
 StoreManager
 StorSolution
 StorStation
 Straptenna
 Streamphone
 Street Style
 Study Wave
 Style
 Style Cube
 Super Betamovie
 Super Bias
 Super Bit Mapping
 Super Cleaning Mechanism
 Super Coat 2
 Super Data
 Super Fine Pitch
 Super HAD CCD
 Super Head Cleaner
 Super Hi-Band
 Super Performance
 SuperBeta
 SuperBeta Hi Fi
 SuperBeta Hi-Fi
 SuperBetamax
 SuperBright
 Superbrix
 SuperLite
 Supersite
 SuperSlim
 SuperSmart
 SuperStation
 SuperTheater
 SupportNet
 Swing Search
 SwivelScreen
 Sxnet
 Symphony
 Synchro Edit
 System G
 System Link
 SystemAlert
 SystemWatch

T
 Tab Marker Indexing System
 Tap Tunes
 Tape Guide
 Tape Your Best Shot
 TechPort
 Tele Plus
 Telepix
 The Absolute Best Way to Record Your Music
 The Art of the Image
 The Big Screen For Small Rooms
 The Definition of Definition
 The Image Studio
 The Image, Pure and Simple
 The Leader in Digital Audio
 The Leader in Digital Technology
 The Leader in Optical Disc
 The Mini Remote
 The Next Generation of Portable Music Is Coming
 The Next Golden Age of Television
 The Official Currency of Playtime
 The Proof is In the Match
 The Repeater
 The Sony Card
 The Sony Partnership
 The Tape With A Brain
 The Values That Unite Us
 There’s A Story Behind Every Image
 Three oval design mark
 Thumb Scan
 Thumb-cam
 Touch Pad Commander
 TrackID
 TrakCam
 Trans Com
 Trini-lite
 Trinicom
 Trinicom (logo)
 Trinicon
 Trinitone
 Trinitron
 Triple X Program
 TruEye
 Twin-View

U
 U-ceiver
 U-matic
 Ultimate Color and Sound
 Ultra Personal
 UMD
 UniCommander
 UniDome
 UniLink
 Unimatch
 Unimatic
 UniPak
 Upgrade Your Image
 USB Direct Connect
 UVWT
 UX Turbo

V
 VAIO
 VAIO Compo
 VAIO Digital Studio
 VAIO Select
 VAIO Slimtop
 VAIO Smart
 VAIO Sphere
 VAIO World
 Vbox
 VCR Mouse
 Vdeck
 Velocity Modulation
 Vialta
 Video 8
 Video Caddy
 Video Hi8
 Video Memo
 Video Printpack
 Video Printpak
 Video Walkman
 Videograph
 Videopress
 VideoStore
 View Font
 View Tools
 VisionTouch
 VisualFlow
 Vivax
 Vizaro

W
 w.ear
 Walkman
 WanBacker
 WatchCam
 WatchCorder
 Watchman
 WatchSensor
 WAV Link
 Wave Hawk
 WaveHawk
 WebSPF
 WEGA
 Wfine
 What's Next Is Now
 Where the Customer Is The One and Only
 Where The Music Takes You
 wisp.ear
 WorkStation
 World Band Radio
 World Band Receiver
 Worry Free
 Worry Free Recording
 Write ‘n Swipe

X
 X tal Lock
 X-tal Lock
 XBR
 XBR2
 XBRITE
 XPERIA
 Xplōd
 Xpri
 XWIDE
 XrossMediaBar

Y
 Your Digital Key To Information

Z
 Z505 SuperSlim Pro
 Zero Footprint Design
 Zero Lux Shot
 Zoomeye

References

External links
 Sony.com trademark list
 Amazon.com Sony trademark list

Trademarks
Sony
Sony